Giorgos Velentzas (4 December 1927 – 20 July 2015) was a Greek actor.

Biography
He studied at the Dramatic School at the Athens Odeum.  He starred in the movie Ochyro 27 in 1948 and made his first in his emphasis in the cinema and at the theatre in 1948 (V. Argyropoulou Company) with the work I apagogi tou Smaragdos.  He also worked alongside the companies of Vembo, Avlonitis, Vasileiadou, Rizos, Voutsas, Chatzichristos, Veggos, etc.  He is characteristically made a role in the movie Apo pou pana gia to havouza, in which his brother of unforgotten Anna Mantzourani in the movie The Charlatan with Thanassia Veggos, he also starred with his father master-Lefteris, Velentzas did several police roles.  He also starred as a soldier for many times, mostly as a police role.  He was educated with a great voice, in many Greek movies from 1950 until 1970 and he also dubbed for television (Little House on the Prairie), he also made an important speech at the radio.  For his appearance in Zoi harisameni in 1993 he won the award for his second role at the Thessaloniki Greek Film Festival. He also appeared in the ANT1 program Konstantinou and Elenis as the father of Matina.

Velentzas died on 20 July 2015.

Filmography

Film

Television
Little House on the Prairie (TV series) (Μικρό σπίτι στο λιβάδι) - as the voice of Rev. Robert Alden (Greek dub)Konstantinou kai Elenis'' - as the father of Matina

References

External links

1927 births
2015 deaths
Male actors from Athens